Bonn is a city on the banks of the Rhine in the German state of North Rhine-Westphalia, with a population of over 300,000.

Bonn may also refer to:

Agreements
 Bonn Agreement (1969), a European environmental agreement
 Bonn Agreement (Afghanistan), the initial series of agreements intended to re-create the State of Afghanistan
 Bonn Agreement (Christianity), a formal affirmation which established full communion between the Church of England and those of the Union of Utrecht
 Convention on the Conservation of Migratory Species of Wild Animals (also the Bonn Convention), an international agreement that aims to conserve migratory species within their migratory ranges

People
 Ferdinand Bonn (1861–1933), German stage and film actor
 Gisela Bonn (1909–1996), German journalist, writer, environmental activist and Indologist
 Herb Bonn (1916–1943), American professional basketball player and World War II fighter pilot
 John Hillric Bonn (1829–1891), first president of the North Hudson County Railway
 Skeeter Bonn (1923–1994), singer and guitar player

Places
 Bonn Square, a city square in Oxford, England
 Bonn, Ohio, an unincorporated community in Washington County, in the U.S. state of Ohio
 Bonn, Victoria, a parish within the county of Rodney, Victoria, Australia
 West Germany (also the Bonn Republic), the Federal Republic of Germany between its formation on 23 May 1949 and German reunification on 3 October 1990

Other
 Bonn Hauptbahnhof, a railway station located on the left bank of the Rhine along the Cologne–Mainz line
 Bonn Minster, a Roman Catholic church in Bonn
 Bonn Stadtbahn, a part of the local public transit system in Bonn and the surrounding Rhein-Sieg area
 German auxiliary Bonn, the third ship of the Berlin-class replenishment ships of the German Navy